The Dispatch also known as The Sydney Dispatch was an English language newspaper published in Sydney, New South Wales, Australia.

Newspaper history 
No. 1, Vol. 1 of The Dispatch was published on Saturday, November 4, 1843. The paper was printed and published at the Office, Harrington Street, by G. O'Brien. The aim of the paper was to "carefully watch the public interest, to carefully guide the public opinion". The paper ceased publication with Vol. 2, no. 61, December 28, 1844.

Digitisation 
The Dispatch has been digitised as part of the Australian Newspapers Digitisation Program by the National Library of Australia.

See also 
 List of newspapers in New South Wales

References

External links 
 

Defunct newspapers published in New South Wales